Newman is an unincorporated community in Daviess County, in the U.S. state of Kentucky.

History
A post office called Newman was established in 1890, and remained in operation until 1973. The community may have the name of Alexander Newman, an early merchant.

References

Unincorporated communities in Daviess County, Kentucky